Professor Homer D. Pithawalla is a practising advocate of the Supreme Court of India and Bombay High Court as well as a solicitor of Bombay High Court, the Supreme Court of England and the Supreme Court of Hong Kong. He is also the senior-most professor of law at the Government Law College, Mumbai and is recognised as one of India's leading experts on Corporate laws (Contract law & Company law) and Competition law.

Career
Prof. Pithawalla graduated from St Xavier's College, before completing his degree in law  Government Law College, the oldest common law college in Asia, where he has been teaching for over 45 years. Prof. Pithawalla then articled as a clerk, and successfully passed the notoriously difficult Bombay Incorporated Law Society's Solicitor's Examination. He completed his LLM in Business and Constitutional Law in 1970, joining academia in 1972 as a teacher at GLC.

Prof. Pithawalla's students include Supreme Court and High Court Judges (including one Chief Justice of India), Attorneys-General, Advocates-General, Ministers, and advocates from all over the world. Initially a Professor of company law, he now also lectures on contract law, property law, family law, constitutional law, legal language, and the conflict of laws. Prof. Pithawalla is also qualified to practice as a solicitor in England and Hong Kong, and is a life member of the Academy of American and International Law of the University of Texas at Dallas.

Apart from teaching at Government Law College for 50 long years, Prof. Pithawalla had been invited to lecture at the Harvard Law School, the Law School at La Sorbonne (Paris, France), the University of Cambridge, the International Bar Association, the Institute of Chartered Accountants, the Institute of Chartered Secretaries, etc.

He was also invited by the Royal Government of Bhutan to draft a contract law for their country. In the course of his visit to Bhutan, his draft was discussed at a workshop chaired by the Attorney General of Bhutan. This Act has now come into force in Bhutan.

A reputed legal academic, known for his generally helpful attitude, Prof Pithawalla currently serves as the chairman of the Government Law College Placement Committee. He is known to take up causes, including speaking out about the infrastructural problems that plague the college, which is widely believed to have contributed to the "running internship" style of education at GLC, wherein students prefer to intern with firms or as paralegals for their legal education, rather than attend lectures.

Prof. Pithawalla is also the author and editor of a series of textbooks, consulted primarily by Indian law students for law exam preparation, due to their simplicity and lucidity. Apart from editing several student-oriented law books, he has authored a series of authoritative texts, including the "Leading Cases on the Law of Contracts",  books on Company Law,  Environment Law, Administrative Law, Land Laws, and The Indian Divorce Act. His now-famous book, "Legal Language, Legal Writing & General English" is a standard text for law students as well as civil and judicial services aspirants.

Prof. Pithawalla speaks English, Hindi, Marathi, Gujarati and French. In addition to teaching French, he has been associated with Alliance Francaise de Bombay since many years. He is also the Vice President of FILA - Franco-Indian Lawyers' Association.

References

1946 births
Living people
20th-century Indian lawyers
Parsi people from Mumbai
Scholars from Mumbai